The 25th Annual SunBank 24 at Daytona was a 24-hour endurance sports car race held on January 31-February 1, 1987 at the Daytona International Speedway road course. The race served as the opening round of the 1987 IMSA GT Championship.

Victory overall and in the GTP class went to the No. 14 Holbert Racing Porsche 962 driven by Chip Robinson, Derek Bell, Al Unser Jr., and Al Holbert. Victory in the GTO Class went to the No. 11 Roush Racing Ford Mustang driven by Tom Gloy, Bill Elliott, Lyn St. James, and Scott Pruett. Victory in the Lights class went to the No. 01 Spice Engineering/AT&T Spice SE86CL driven by Bob Earl, Don Bell, and Jeff Kline. Victory in the GTU class went to the No. 71 Team Highball Mazda RX-7 driven by Amos Johnson, Dennis Shaw, and Bob Lazier.

Race results
Class winners in bold.

References

24 Hours of Daytona
1987 in sports in Florida
1987 in American motorsport